Amos Lake may refer to:

Amos Lake (Antarctica), a lake on Signy Island
Amos Lake (Minnesota), a lake in Douglas County
Amos Lake (Connecticut), a lake in New London County